The women's 10,000 metres walk event at the 2002 World Junior Championships in Athletics was held in Kingston, Jamaica, at National Stadium on 18 July.

Medalists

Results

Final
18 July

Participation
According to an unofficial count, 24 athletes from 18 countries participated in the event.

References

10,000 metres walk
Racewalking at the World Athletics U20 Championships